Liepiņš (Old orthography: Leepin(g); feminine: Liepiņa) is a Latvian topographic surname, derived from the Latvian word for "linden tree" (liepa). Individuals with the surname include:

Arvis Liepiņš (born 1990), Latvian cross-country skier
Emīls Liepiņš (born 1992), Latvian cyclist 
Jānis Liepiņš (1894–1964), Latvian painter
Kaspars Liepiņš (born 1984), Latvian sidecarcross rider
Ilmārs Liepiņš (1947–2007), Latvian football player
Modris Liepiņš (born 1966), Latvian race walker
Zigmārs Liepiņš (born 1952), Latvian composer

See also
Lepin
Liepa

References

Latvian-language masculine surnames
Surnames of Latvian origin